Suckfish is the debut LP by Audion, an alias of Matthew Dear.  It was generally well received by critics, with a score of 80/100 on Metacritic.

Track listing 
"Vegetables" – 5:54
"Your Place or Mine" – 6:29
"Titty Fuck" – 7:11
"T.B." – 7:55
"Kisses" – 5:27
"Wield" – 8:15
"Taut" – 8:19
"Rubber" – 3:38
"Uvular" – 7:18
"The Pong" – 5:26
"Just Fucking" – 5:40

References

2005 albums
Matthew Dear albums
Ghostly International albums